Home, James is a 2013 American romantic drama film directed by and starring Jonathan Rossetti.

Cast
Jonathan Rossetti as James
Kerry Knuppe as Cooper
Julie Gearheard as Sam
Rick Dacey as Mike
Kathleen Rose Perkins as Anita Massie
Marshall Bell as Larry
Maggie Kiley as Mother

Production
The film was shot in Tulsa, Oklahoma.

Reception
The film has an 83% rating on Rotten Tomatoes.  Michael Smith of Tulsa World awarded the film three stars out of four.

Accolades
The film won the Best Oklahoma Film award at the 2013 DeadCENTER Film Festival.

References

External links
 
 

2013 films
American romantic drama films
2010s English-language films
2010s American films